João Fernando Nelo (born 18 March 1979 in São Paulo), commonly known as Fernando Baiano, is a Brazilian footballer who played for Mogi Mirim Esporte Clube as a striker. He is married to Bruna Lopes since 2011

Football career
After five successful years in native Brazil with Corinthians, Internacional and Flamengo, Baiano moved abroad, joining Bundesliga's VfL Wolfsburg and scoring 11 league goals in his sole season, upon which he returned to his country with São Caetano.

In January 2005, Baiano signed for La Liga side Málaga CF, netting on nine occasions to help the Andalusia team reach a mid-table final place. During that summer, he left for Celta de Vigo: during his spell in Galicia, the club would participate in the UEFA Cup but also be relegated to Segunda División, with the player contributing with 32 goals in 80 official appearances in the process.

Upon Celta's relegation, Baiano agreed to a three-year contract with Real Murcia, for approximately €5 million. After just five league goals during the 2007–08 campaign his team finished second from the bottom, with the subsequent relegation.

In August 2008 Baiano was loaned to Al Jazira Club, in the United Arab Emirates. In June of the following year he moved to another side in the city, Al-Wahda SCC, penning a two-year contract for €5million – the player originally requested a three-year deal for €9m.

References

External links

1979 births
Living people
Footballers from São Paulo
Brazilian footballers
Association football forwards
Campeonato Brasileiro Série A players
Sport Club Corinthians Paulista players
Sport Club Internacional players
CR Flamengo footballers
Associação Desportiva São Caetano players
São Bernardo Futebol Clube players
Mogi Mirim Esporte Clube players
Bundesliga players
VfL Wolfsburg players
La Liga players
Málaga CF players
RC Celta de Vigo players
Real Murcia players
UAE Pro League players
Al Jazira Club players
Al Wahda FC players
Ittihad FC players
Brazil under-20 international footballers
Brazilian expatriate footballers
Expatriate footballers in Germany
Expatriate footballers in Spain
Expatriate footballers in the United Arab Emirates
Expatriate footballers in Saudi Arabia
Brazilian expatriate sportspeople in Spain
Brazilian expatriate sportspeople in the United Arab Emirates
Saudi Professional League players